Lamine Cheriff Toure (born 24 December 2003) is an English footballer who plays as a defender for Lancaster City on loan from League One side Bolton Wanderers.

Career
Toure came through the Bolton Wanderers Reserves Academy after joining at U12 level. On 13 June 2022, Toure became one of the five Academy graduates that signed their first professional contracts with Bolton.

Toure made his Bolton debut on 10 August 2022 in a 5–1 victory against Salford City in the EFL Cup, coming on in the 88th minute as a substitute for Gethin Jones.

On 25 November 2022, he moved on loan to Lancaster City until 3 January 2023.

Career statistics

References

Living people
2003 births
Association football defenders
English footballers
English Football League players
Bolton Wanderers F.C. players
Lancaster City F.C. players